The Crimes Ordinance , last amended in 1972, is a law relating to certain consolidated penal enactments. Like Macau, penal/criminal law in Hong Kong is different from what is applied in China.

History
The ordinance consolidated the original Crimes Ordinance of 1971 with several others ordinances:

 Coinage Offences Ordinance 1964 (Cap. 204)
 Criminal Intimidation Ordinance 1964 (Cap. 205)
 Explosive Substances Ordinance 1966 (Cap. 206)
 False Personation Ordinance 1964 (Cap. 207)
 Falsification of Documents Ordinance 1964 (Cap. 208)
 Forgery Ordinance 1964 (Cap. 209)
 Perjury Ordinance 1970 (Cap. 214)
 Punishment of Incest Ordinance 1964 (Cap. 216)
 Sedition Ordinance 1970 (Cap. 217)

Current version
The current provisions of the ordinance includes:

 Treason
 Other offences against the state
 Piracy
 Intimidation
 Perjury
 Incest
 Explosive substances
 Unmarked Plastic Explosives
 Criminal Damage to Property
 Forgery and related offences
 False Certification and personation
 Counterfeiting and kindred offences
 Sexual and Related Offences
 Preliminary offences
 Miscellaneous Offences

See also
 Legal system of Macau
 Law of Hong Kong

Penal/criminal codes from other parts of China:

 Penal Code of Macau

Penal/criminal codes from similar Common law jurisdictions:
 Crimes Act
 Criminal Code (Canada)
 English Criminal Code

External links

 Crimes Ordinance

Hong Kong legislation
Crime in Hong Kong
Criminal codes